Vladimir Vićentijević (born 13 July 1974) is a retired Serbian shot putter who represented Yugoslavia.

Biography
He finished fourteenth at the 1992 World Junior Championships and competed at the 1996 European Indoor Championships without reaching the final. He became Yugoslav shot put champion in 1995, breaking a long winning streak for Dragan Perić.

References

1974 births
Living people
Serbian male shot putters
Yugoslav male shot putters